Albert James Callan (December 1839 – 9 May 1912) was a Company director, and a member of  both the Queensland Legislative Council and Queensland Legislative Assembly.

Early life
Callan was born in Dublin, Ireland to John Bartholomew Callan and his wife Isabella (née Duthie) and educated at Jesuit's College, Dublin.

Political career
Following the resignation of  Robert Lyons, he entered state politics in 1889, winning a by-election for the seat of Fitzroy. Callan held the seat until the 1902 state election which he did not contest.

Callan was then appointed to the Queensland Legislative Council in July 1902, remaining a member till his death ten years later.

Personal life
Callan married Ellen Milford in 1870, and together had four children. He was a director of Walter Reid & Co., Mt Morgan Gold Mining Co., and the National Bank.

He died in May 1912 and was buried in Toowong Cemetery.

References

Members of the Queensland Legislative Council
Members of the Queensland Legislative Assembly
1839 births
1912 deaths
Burials at Toowong Cemetery
Irish emigrants to colonial Australia